Phasmotaenia is a genus of phasmids belonging to the family Phasmatidae.

The species of this genus are found in Southeastern Asia.

Species:

Phasmotaenia australe 
Phasmotaenia bukaense 
Phasmotaenia godeffroyi 
Phasmotaenia guentheri 
Phasmotaenia inermis 
Phasmotaenia laeviceps 
Phasmotaenia lanyuhensis 
Phasmotaenia salomonense 
Phasmotaenia sanchezi 
Phasmotaenia spinosa 
Phasmotaenia spinosa 
Phasmotaenia virgea

References

Phasmatidae